The siege of Freetown was a battle during the Sierra Leone Civil War. It began when Johnny Paul Koroma took over the power from Ahmad Tejan Kabbah and began a dictatorship. In response, ECOMOG troops, led by Nigeria, helped the Sierra Leone Army to attack and remove Koroma from power and Kabbah was elected back in post. In revenge, Koroma's allies, the RUF, assaulted the city but were forced to retreat.

In fiction
The battle was portrayed in the film Blood Diamond (taking place in 1999, in spite of the RUF take over, taking place in 1997).

References

Bibliography
Mark Malan, 'Layered Response' To an African Conflict Or muddling through in Sierra Leone? 

Sierra Leone Civil War